Yadrin (Yetĕrne) is a town and the administrative center of Yadrinsky District of the Chuvash Republic, Russia. Population:

History
Yadrin was founded in 1590 as a fortified settlement. It was granted town status in 1781.

Administrative and municipal status
Within the framework of administrative divisions, Yadrin serves as the administrative center of Yadrinsky District. As an administrative division, it is incorporated within Yadrinsky District as Yadrinskoye Urban Settlement. As a municipal division, this administrative unit has urban settlement status and is a part of Yadrinsky Municipal District.

Demography
The Russian Federation Census 2010 reported a resident population for Yadrin of 9,614, a 5% decline from the 1989 census. The population of Yadrin peaked in 1996 at 11,000, and has since declined steadily.

Ethnic composition
The population of Yadrin consists mainly of the two following ethnic groups; the Chuvash (67%), and ethnic Russians (31%).

Economy
Yadrin has several factories and development bases of the companies of heavy and food industry (e.g., Yadrin machinery plant, Yadrin factory of metal products, YMZ-Energy, Yadrin garment factory, Yadrin meat-packing plant).
The town has branches of the following banks: Sberbank of Russia, Rosselkhozbank, Rosgosstrakh Bank.

Education
In Yadrin are 3 schools, a sport school and the Palace children's creativity.

Culture

Museums
 Yadrin regional arts and local lore Museum;
 The House-museum of artist of the USSR N.D.Mordvinov.

Main sights
 Holy Trinity Cathedral;
 The Building of The Provincial Assembly;
 The house of the merchant Zheleznov.

Notable residents
Notable people born in Yadrin include:
 Nikolay Ashmarin, Russian and Soviet linguist, Turkologist;

References

Notes

Sources

 Ядрин старше и его название не связано с ядрами

Cities and towns in Chuvashia
Yadrinsky Uyezd
Populated places established in 1590